Jarni Koorman (born 15 March 1999) is a Dutch professional footballer who plays as a midfielder for Eerste Divisie club TOP Oss.

Career
Born in Zwolle, Koorman started playing in the youth department of Be Quick '28. He then joined local Eredivisie side FC Twente in 2016, where he progressed through the youth system until reaching to the reserves, Jong FC Twente. In the summer of 2018, Koorman moved to PEC Zwolle, where he signed a two-year contract. On 1 February 2020, he made his debut for the club in a match against Groningen. 

On 11 September 2020, Koorman signed a two-year contract with TOP Oss, after rumours had linked him to Go Ahead Eagles and SpVgg Greuther Fürth. He made his debut for the club on 15 September in a 3–0 away loss to Almere City.

Personal life
Jarni Koorman is the son of former professional footballer, Marco Koorman, who played for Groningen and PEC Zwolle.

References

Living people
1999 births
Association football midfielders
Dutch footballers
FC Twente players
PEC Zwolle players
TOP Oss players
Eredivisie players
Eerste Divisie players
Jong FC Twente players